Ahmed Qessab (born 15 April 1981 in Marrakech) is a Moroccan footballer who usually plays as a defender. He is currently without a team and has spent his entire career at Kawkab Marrakech in the Botola.

References

Moroccan footballers
1981 births
Living people
Sportspeople from Marrakesh
Kawkab Marrakech players
Association football defenders